KBHC (1260 AM) was a radio station serving the Texarkana area with a Hispanic format. The station was under the ownership of Arklatex Radio, Inc.

KBHC's license was cancelled by the Federal Communications Commission on March 12, 2019, due to the station having been silent since May 28, 2017.

References

External links
FCC Station Search Details: DKBHC (Facility ID: 2310)
FCC History Cards for KBHC (covering 1958-1979)

BHC
Radio stations established in 1959
BHC
1959 establishments in Arkansas
BHC
Defunct radio stations in the United States
Radio stations disestablished in 2019
2019 disestablishments in Arkansas
BHC
Nashville, Arkansas